Rorgon II ( – ) was the Count of Maine from 849–865.

He was the eldest son of Rorgon I. As Count, he succeeded Gauzbert (brother of Rorgon I), and was succeeded by his own brother, Gauzfrid.

References

 

800s births
865 deaths
9th-century French people
9th-century rulers in Europe
Counts of Maine